Moti Mahal, is one of the oldest houses in Karachi. It now houses a school in Gulshan-e-Iqbal Block 3 Area of Karachi, Sindh, Pakistan.The name "Moti Mahal" means: "the Palace of Pearls". This place is also renowned for Bus stop since 1973–74.

There are a number of marriage halls and mobile shopping malls nearby. The Moti Mahal lies between Gulshan Chowrangi and Federal B. Area 16 number. 

Owners of this building [Kripalani Family] lived there till 1947. Since the owners were Hindus, they deemed it better to migrate to India than to stay in Pakistan, after the partition.

Moti Mahal still exists and looks the same as before, although its appears to be not maintained well.

See also
 Gulshan-e-Iqbal

External links 
 Official Karachi Website
 Official webpage on Gulshan Town

Buildings and structures in Karachi